Clos is a surname. Notable people with the surname include:

 Dani Clos (born 1988), Spanish racing driver
 Dominique Clos (1821–1908), French botanist
 Joan Clos (born 1949), Spanish politician
 Paco Clos (born 1960), Spanish footballer